Tauste is a municipality located in the province of Zaragoza, Aragon, Spain.

History 
Sights include the Mudéjar church of Santa María, begun in the late 13th century and finished in the 14th century. It has an octagonal tower, a Baroque retable (16th century) and a Renaissance retable of the Coronation of Mary.

In November 2020, archaeologists headed by Javier Nunez Arce announced the discovery of 400 Islamic graves belong to Al-Andalus era. After this discovery it was clear that Muslim community used to live here and they had a Mosque. Archaeologist Arce  mentioned Tauste as an important settlement for Muslims and added that "we can see that the Muslim culture and the Islamic presence in this region are more significant than we think."

Twin towns
 Espalion, France
 Langhirano, Italy

Related personalities

 Fray Antonio Asensio Andrés (1280-ca. 1320), Franciscan theologian
 Juan Belveder (16th century), mathematician
 Marcelino Uberte de la Cerda (17th century), author of medical publications, poet
Juan de Jarauta Zapata (1664-1717), silversmith
 Jaime Ortega y Olleta (1817-1860), military and politician
 Angel Ramírez Carrera (1821-1893), conservative politician, Cortes deputy
 Mariano Supervía Lostalé (1835-1918), bishop of Huesca
 Javier Ramírez Orúe (1871-1943), conservative politician, president of Diputación Provincial
 Pedro Longás Bartibás (1881-1968), historian and archivist
 Javier Ramírez Sinués (1898-1977), Carlist politician, Cortes deputy and civil governor
 Tomás Aragüés Bayarte (1903-1956), composer
 José María Conget Arizaleta (1926-2001), bishop of Jaca
 Zacarías Alegre Pellicer (1943-2011), sculptor
 Chusé Inazio Nabarro (born  1962), writer

References

Municipalities in the Province of Zaragoza